Ibrahimpur is a village in Shaheed Bhagat Singh Nagar district of Punjab State, India. The village is administrated by Sarpanch an elected representative of the village.

Demography 
As of 2011, Ibrahimpur has a total number of 22 houses and population of 115 of which 62 include are males while 53 are females according to the report published by Census India in 2011. The literacy rate of Ibrahimpur is 60.78%, lower than the state average of 75.84%. The population of children under the age of 6 years is 13 which is 11.30% of total population of Ibrahimpur, and child sex ratio is approximately 1600 as compared to Punjab state average of 846.

Most of the people are from Schedule Caste which constitutes 46.96% of total population in Ibrahimpur. The town does not have any Schedule Tribe population so far.

As per the report published by Census India in 2011, 40 people were engaged in work activities out of the total population of Ibrahimpur which includes 38 males and 2 females. According to census survey report 2011, 97.50% workers describe their work as main work and 2.50% workers are involved in Marginal activity providing livelihood for less than 6 months.

Education 
KC Engineering College and Doaba Khalsa Trust Group Of Institutions are the nearest colleges.

Transport 

See also 
List of villages in India

References

External links 
 Tourism of Punjab
 Census of Punjab
 Locality Based PINCode

Villages in Shaheed Bhagat Singh Nagar district